Roy Edward Kimberley Bent (1900 – 7 October 1975) was an Australian rules footballer who played with the Norwood Football Club in the South Australian Football Association.

Football
He was the competition's leading goal kicker on four occasions 1921, 1924, 1925 and 1926. 

Late in the 1923 minor round Roy Bent was suspended for six matches for throwing the ball at a boundary umpire and 'bruising his chest'. Later in the year he was jokingly awarded a leather medal in remembrance of his suspension.

Death
He was killed in a car accident in 1975.

Notes

1900 births
1975 deaths
Australian rules footballers from New South Wales
Australian Rules footballers: place kick exponents
Norwood Football Club players
North Broken Hill Football Club players
Road incident deaths in South Australia
Date of birth unknown